Morgan Daniel Pitney (born March 24, 1993 in Cherry Valley, Illinois) is an American country music singer. In May 2014, he signed to Curb Records. He has released two studio albums: Behind This Guitar (2016), and Ain't Lookin' Back (2020)

Musical career
Mo Pitney was born in Rockford, Illinois. He began playing drums at 6 and guitar at 12. He played in a bluegrass band with his brother and a friend. Pitney moved to Nashville, Tennessee, where he signed to Curb Records and began working with record producer Tony Brown.

Pitney released his single "Country", in December 2014. He co-wrote the song with Bill Anderson and Bobby Tomberlin. Billy Dukes of Taste of Country reviewed the single positively, saying that "Mo isn’t making a statement, and he’s not the sign of some traditional country revolution in 2015. But he’s a reminder of how good a simple country song sung by a man who believes in God and George Strait can feel." Johnny Nevin of Huffington Post also reviewed Pitney's music favorably, saying that "Mo Pitney knows a couple of really important things about being Country, real Country. One of them is that he knows who he is, and that's always going to be important, because it's the only way anyone can keep becoming the person they really want to be. Just as important though, it seems like Mo Pitney never forgets about everybody else, and how important they are too." It was the third most added country song its first week at radio. The song entered Top 40 on Country Airplay on the chart dated for the week ending June 20, 2015, its nineteenth week on that chart. His second single, "Boy & a Girl Thing", released to country radio on August 31, 2015. It reached #50 on Hot Country Songs in October 2016. His debut album is Behind This Guitar. The album's third single, "Everywhere", went for adds at country radio on February 13, 2017.

Pitney's debut album, Behind This Guitar, was released on October 7, 2016 and featured collaborations with Morgane Stapleton and Mac McAnally.  It charted at No. 10 on Billboard's Top Country Albums in its first week.

Discography

Studio albums

Singles

Music videos

References

External links

1993 births
American country singer-songwriters
American male singer-songwriters
Country musicians from Illinois
Curb Records artists
Living people
People from Cherry Valley, Illinois
Singer-songwriters from Illinois
21st-century American singers
21st-century American male singers